Dave Naylor is a sports journalist and reporter for TSN's SportsCentre, with a focus on the Canadian Football League. He previously worked for CBC Radio and the Globe and Mail. He was inducted into the Canadian Football Hall of Fame's Media Wing on November 29, 2015. He studied journalism at Carleton University.

References

External links
 TSN biography

Canadian columnists
Carleton University alumni
Journalists from Ontario
People from Ottawa
Living people
Canadian Football Hall of Fame inductees
Year of birth missing (living people)